Luís Filipe Loureiro Comparato (born in 1949), known as Doc Comparato, is a Brazilian writer of miniseries, television series and Brazilian cinema.

Career
He was a founder of the Centro de Criação da Rede Globo, acting as writer of shows like Mulher (1998), O Tempo e o Vento (1985),  A Justiceira (1997), and  Lampião e Maria Bonita (1982), receiving the Gold Medal of Cinema and Television Festival of New York.

He worked in Europe, writing for film and television, including the miniseries "Me alquilo para soñar" (1989) with Gabriel García Márquez. Internationally recognized, he received nine awards, including the Japan Award for Television (1980/1981), the DAAD - Deuchst Academic Art Development (2002) and the Theatre Prize Anna Magnani (2003-2004), in Italy.

He is the author of two books: Roteiro (1982), on the art and technique of writing for cinema and television; and Da Criação ao Roteiro (1984), a book for writers and film students. He was the first Brazilian playwright to teach a TV script and film course in Brazil in the Casa das Artes Laranjeiras (Rio). He is the father of actresses Bianca and Lorena Comparato.

Work

Television 

 2008 - Os Mutantes - Caminhos do Coração (telenovela- Rede Record) - Colaborador
 2007 - Caminhos do Coração (telenovela - Rede Record) - Colaborador
 1998 - Mulher (série)|Mulher  (series - TV Globo)
 1997 - A Justiceira (miniseries - TV Globo)
 1994 - Arnau (Spanish miniseries)
 1993 - Retrato de Mulher (series - TV Globo)
 1992 - Procura-se (Portuguese series)
 1990 - A, E, I, O... Urca (miniseries - TV Globo)
 1989 - Me alquilo para soñar (Spanish miniseries)
 1988 - Histórias que o Diabo Gosta (Portuguese series)
 1985 - O Tempo e o Vento (minissérie)|O Tempo e o Vento (miniseries - TV Globo)
 1984 - Padre Cícero (minissérie)|Padre Cícero (miniseries - TV Globo)
 1983 - Bandidos da Falange (1983) (miniseries - TV Globo)
 1982 - Lampião e Maria Bonita (miniseries - TV Globo)
 1979 - Plantão de Polícia (series - TV Globo)

Theater 
 2013 - Nadistas e Tudistas (Ipanema Theater -RJ)
 2010 - Lição Número 18 (Poeira Theater -RJ)
 1985/2007 - Nostradamos (CCBB-RJ, SalaUno Roma, Jardel Filho Theater -SP) 
 2002 - O Círculo das Luzes (Maison de France-RJ)
 2001 - Michelangelo (Carlos Gomes Theater  -RJ)
 1981 - O Beijo da Louca (Villa Lobos Theater -RJ)
 1980 - As Tias (Teatro Lagoa Theater -RJ)

Cinema 

 2007 - El corazón de la tierra (Spanish movie)
 1993 - Encontros Imperfeitos (Portuguese  movie)
 1992 - Viuvez Secreta (Portuguese  movie)
 1984 - Águia na Cabeça 
 1983 - O Cangaceiro Trapalhão
 1983 - O Trapalhão na Arca de Noé
 1981 - O Beijo no Asfalto
 1981 - A Mulher Sensual
 1981 - Bonitinha mas Ordinária ou Otto Lara Rezende
 1979 - O Bom Burguês

Publications 

 1979 - Sangue, Papéis e Lágrimas]] (contos editora Codecri)
 1983 - Roteiro, arte e técnica de escrever para televisão e cinema (editora Nórdica)
 1983 - El Guión (Garay Ediciones; Buenos Aires AR, Editora Planeta; D.F. México)
 1988 - De La Creación Al Guión (Madri: Instituto Oficial Radio televisión)
 2002 - Scrivere un Filme (Dino Audino Roma, Itália)
 2009 - Da Criação ao Roteiro''(Editora Summus SP)
 1984 - Nadistas e Tudistas (Editora Ebal-Rio de Janeiro)
 1984 - A Incrível Viagem (Editora Ebal-Rio de Janeiro)
 1981 - Me Alquilo Para Soñar (Casa - Jorge Niterói RJ)

References

External links

 Official site 
 Official site
Memória Globo 

1949 births
Living people
Writers from Rio de Janeiro (city)
Brazilian people of Portuguese descent
Brazilian male writers